Alekos Michaelides (13 August 1933 – 6 January 2008) was a Cypriot politician. He served as Foreign Minister, and as President of the House of Representatives from 1977 to 1981.

Biography
Alekos Michaelides was born on August 13, 1933 in Milikouri in the district of the capital Nicosia.

In 1977, he was elected President of the House of Representatives, a post he held until 1981.

He later served as Minister of Foreign Affairs from 1993 until 1997. In 1994, he established stronger diplomatic ties with Israel, opening an embassy there.

He studied Economics at the Georgia Tech in the United States.

Michaelides died on 6 January 2008 at the age of 74.

References

News

External links
 

1933 births
2008 deaths
Presidents of the House of Representatives (Cyprus)
Cyprus Ministers of Foreign Affairs
People from Nicosia